was a town located in Hiba District, Hiroshima Prefecture, Japan. The site of a feudal castle from the Sengoku period, it was first incorporated as a town in 1898. It then went through several mergers with other towns and villages in the area before being incorporated itself into the city of Shōbara in March 2005. It is now a municipal division within Shōbara.

There are three elementary schools, a junior high school, and a high school located in Saijō. The area is served by the JR West Geibi and Kisuki railway lines. Saijō is located on Japan National Route 183 and 314, and is crossed by three major Hiroshima Prefectural Highways and ten smaller prefectural highways.

Etymology
A comparable castle was built in the nearby Tōjō (which means "East Castle Town"). Neither castle is still standing, though you can view parts of the ruins (mostly foundation and other walls).

History
During the 5th century A.D., a kofun grave chamber was constructed in the area. On February 10, 1898, the village of Saijō was incorporated into the town of Saijō. On October 1 of the same year, the districts of Ezo, Nuka, and Mikami, along with the town of Saijō and the villages of Mikoto and Yahoko, were combined to create Hiba District.

A new town of Saijō was created on February 11, 1942 when the original town of Saijō and the village of Mikoto merged. Due to geographic considerations, the Miino Yukiasa section of Yahoko Village was split off on December 1, 1953 and merged with Hachikawa Village in the Nita District of Shimane Prefecture.

The town of Saijō reincorporated on March 31, 1954 when it merged with the village of Yahoko. Fifty-one years later, the towns of Saijō, Hiwa, Kuchiwa, Takano, and Tōjō from Hiba District, Hiroshima, and the town of Sōryō (from Kōnu District) all merged with the city of Shōbara. After 106 years of independent history, the town of Saijō ceased to exist, and it became a municipal division within Shōbara.

Demographics
As of November 2021, the town had a population of 3,146 and a density of 13.86 persons per km². The total area was 226.91 km².

Education
There are currently four public schools in operation in Saijō.

 is located near the south end of the main part of town, just across the river from Route 183.  is located just off Route 183, southwest of Hibayama Station.

 stands atop a hill overlooking the main business district and the Shōbara Municipal Saijō Shimin Hospital. The high school,  is located on top of a hill to the southwest of the junior high school, and directly above and to the northwest of Saijō Elementary School. It was previously named .

Transportation

Highways
Japan National Route 314 travels south from Shimane Prefecture, then turns east toward Okayama Prefecture after briefly joining Japan National Route 183 for about 1 km at Bingo-Ochiai Station. The Hibayama Onsen is located on Route 314 about halfway between Bingo-Ochiai Station and Yuki Station. Route 314 originates in Fukuyama, Hiroshima and terminates in Unnan, Shimane.

Japan National Route 183 originates in Naka-ku, Hiroshima and terminates in Yonago, Tottori. It travels through Saijō northeast from near Hirako Station, generally following the Geibi Line until the Geibi Line turns southeast at the Yahoko Post Office. Route 183 instead continues northeast past the turnoff for Dōgoyama Takahara Ski Resort before entering Tottori Prefecture.

The following prefectural highways serve Saijō:

Railways
JR West operates multiple stations along two rail lines in Saijō.

Dōgoyama Station gives quick access to Takaohara Ski Resort, Snow Resort Nekoyama, and Dōgoyama Takahara Ski Resort (all within ), as well as Kurokan Park and the Suzuran no Yu onsen (both within ).

The Kisuki Line travels  from Bingo-Ochiai Station to Yuki Station before going to Miinohara Station in Shimane Prefecture.

References

External links
 Shōbara official website 

Dissolved municipalities of Hiroshima Prefecture